Flavipsychrobacter is a Gram-negative genus of bacteria from the family of Chitinophagaceae with one known species (Flavipsychrobacter stenotrophus). Flavipsychrobacter stenotrophus has been isolated from the Renlongba glacier in Tibet.

References

Chitinophagia
Bacteria genera
Monotypic bacteria genera
Taxa described in 2018